Goodenia krauseana is a species of flowering plant in the family Goodeniaceae and is endemic to part of Western Australia. It is a prostrate to ascending herb densely covered with silvery bristles, and has lance-shaped leaves at the base, sometimes with a few teeth on the edges, and small groups of yellow flowers with a brownish centre.

Description
Flowering mainly occurs from October to December and the fruit is a more or less spherical capsule  in diameter.

Taxonomy and naming
This goodenia was first formally described in 1912 by Kurt Krause who gave it the name Goodenia nana, but that name was illegitimate because it had already been used (by Willem Hendrik de Vriese for a plant now known as a synonym of Goodenia humilis R.Br.). In 1980, Roger Charles Carolin changed the name to Goodenia krauseana in the journal Telopea. The specific epithet (krauseana) honours Krause who revised the family Goodeniaceae in Das Pflanzenreich.

Distribution and habitat
This goodenia grows on rocky hills in the Eastern Goldfields and Great Victoria Desert regions of Western Australia.

Conservation status
Goodenia krauseana is classified as "not threatened" by the Government of Western Australia Department of Parks and Wildlife.

References

krauseana
Eudicots of Western Australia
Plants described in 1980
Taxa named by Roger Charles Carolin
Endemic flora of Australia